Deportes Iberia is a Chilean football club based in Los Ángeles that currently plays in Primera B (second-tier). The club hold its home games at Estadio Municipal de Los Ángeles which has a capacity of 5,000 spectators.

In 1933, the club was officially established as Deportes Iberia, basing in Conchalí (Santiago). Then Iberia joined the Asociación de Fútbol de Santiago, but recently in 1946 the club joined Primera División, spending there eight years until the 1954 season when they, after finishing in the bottom of the table, were relegated to second-tier, being the first Chilean relegated team in its football history.

During its age playing at Segunda División on mid-1960s, the club moved to Puente Alto and stayed there two seasons from 1966 to 1968 before its definitely move to Los Ángeles at Bío Bío Region in 1969.

The team also has a rivalry with Malleco Unido from Angol as well as with Curicó Unido.

Iberia has won three Segunda División Profesional titles and a Copa Apertura Segunda División title in 1984.

History
The institution was founded on June 15, 1933, by Cristian López, small merchants of La Vega Central Market and a Spanish catholic reverend called Gilberto Lizana, after the decision of that last one to create a football branch. At the end of that year and for only eight days, the team adopted the name of Deportivo Ínser.

In 1971, Iberia failed to reach its first ever promotion to first-level after losing the race for the title with Unión San Felipe of the coach Luis Santibáñez who even achieved a feat following proclaiming champion of Primera División in 1972.

In 1992, following 37 years playing in the second tier, the club was relegated to Tercera División. After winning the 2013–14 tournament, Iberia reached its promotion and broke a 21-year absence at second division, now called Primera B.

Current squad

2021 Winter Transfers

In

Out

Stadium

Since Iberia moved from Puente Alto to Los Angeles in 1968 they play his home games at the Estadio Municipal de Los Ángeles which has a 4,125 capacity.

For a long time the ground was property of the public finance, but in 1990s the stadium became part of Los Angeles municipality. In August 2010, a running track financed by National Institute of Sports of Chile was built.

On 21 May 2015, President of Chile Michelle Bachelet through his public account realized in the National Congress at Valparaíso, announced that Ovalle, La Calera, San Felipe and Los Angeles would have new stadiums. Nevertheless, it was reported that in Los Angeles’ situation the new stadium wouldn't be remodeled for establish a new ground of 5,000 capacity.

Managers
 Ronald Fuentes (2008–??)
 Nelson Soto (2015–)

Honours

Professional
Segunda División de Chile (3): 2012, 2013, 2013–14
Copa Apertura Segunda División: 1984

Amateur
División de Honor Amateur (DIVHA) (1): 1945

See also
Chilean football league system

References

External links
 Official Website 

 
Football clubs in Chile
Sport in Biobío Region
Association football clubs established in 1933
1933 establishments in Chile